Do Risos e Lagrimas is a 1926 Brazilian drama film directed by Alberto Traversa.

The film premiered in Rio de Janeiro on 25 August 1926.

Cast
Eduardo Arouca as João de Souza 
João Baldi   
Túlia Burlini   
Virgínia Cassoval   
Anita Henrys as Ophelia 
Daniel Herlink   
N. Jacobson as Apolinário 
Guy Leal as Simões 
A. Longari   
Luiz Gonzaga Martins   
Inah Renlow as Inah 
Aldo Rine as Fernando 
Luiz Roberto   
Alberto Traversa

External links
 

1926 drama films
1926 films
Brazilian black-and-white films
Brazilian silent films
Brazilian drama films
Silent drama films